Enid Anne Campbell MacRobbie, FRS (born 1931, Edinburgh, Scotland) is a Scottish plant scientist, and Emeritus Professor of Plant Biophysics at the University of Cambridge. Her specialty is biophysics, with particular interests in ion fluxes and stomata.

She was appointed "to a Personal Professorship in 1987, the first woman scientist in Cambridge to be awarded a Personal Chair." She was elected a Fellow of the Royal Society of London in 1991 and of the Royal Society of Edinburgh in 1998. She is also a Foreign Member of the National Academy of Sciences and a Corresponding Member of the American Society of Plant Biologists. Roger Spanswick was a member of her laboratory.

Selected works
MacRobbie, E.A.C. (2000) "ABA activates multiple Ca2+ fluxes in stomatal guard cells, triggering vacuolar K+ (Rb+) release." Proc. Natl. Acad. Sci. USA, 97: 12361-12368.
MacRobbie, E.A.C. (2002) "Evidence for a role for protein tyrosine phosphatase in the control of ion release from the guard cell vacuole in stomatal closure." Proc. Natl. Acad. Sci. USA, 99: 11563-11568.

References

External links
Google scholar

1931 births
Living people
Female Fellows of the Royal Society
Foreign associates of the National Academy of Sciences
Scottish biologists
Scottish biophysicists
Fellows of Girton College, Cambridge
Fellows of the Royal Society